Prophet of Moonshae is a fantasy novel by Douglas Niles, set in the world of the Forgotten Realms, and based on the Dungeons & Dragons game.

Plot summary
Prophet of Moonshae is a novel in which King Tristan's daughters Alicia and Dierdre become involved a conflict in which the forces of the god Talos attempt to conquer their lands.

Reception

Reviews
Kliatt
Backstab #9

References

1992 American novels
Forgotten Realms novels